Vinji Vrh pri Semiču is a village in the Municipality of Semič in southeastern Slovenia. The area is part of the historical region of Lower Carniola. The municipality is now included in the Southeast Slovenia Statistical Region.

Name
The name of the settlement was changed from Vinji Vrh to Vinji Vrh pri Semiču in 1955. In the past the German name was Weinberg.

Church

The local church is dedicated to the Holy Trinity and belongs to the Parish of Semič. It dates to the mid-17th century.

References

External links
Vinji Vrh pri Semiču at Geopedia

Populated places in the Municipality of Semič